This article provides two lists:
A list of National Basketball Association players by total career regular season  free throws made.
A progressive list of free throws made leaders showing how the record has increased through the years.

Free throws made leaders
This is a list of National Basketball Association players by total career regular season free throws made.
Statistics accurate as of March 16, 2023.

Progressive list of free throw scoring leaders
This is a progressive list of free throw scoring leaders showing how the record has increased through the years.
Statistics accurate as of March 16, 2023.

See also

Notes

References

External links
Basketball-Reference.com enumeration of NBA career leaders in free throws made
National Basketball Association official website enumeration of NBA career leaders in free throws made

National Basketball Association lists
National Basketball Association statistical leaders